Nasser Aghaie (Persian: ناصر آقایی; January 20, 1944 in Tehran – December 27, 2009 in Tehran) was an Iranian boxer who became a member of Iran senior national Boxing team in 1963. He participated as a member of this  team at the first Asian Amateur Boxing Championships in Bangkok, Thailand in 1963, and at the 1964 Summer Olympics, in the Flyweight division, and at 1966 Asian Games, in the Featherweight division, and also at the third Asian Amateur Boxing Championships in Colombo, Ceylon in 1967.

Boxing career
Aghaei made his national debut with the Iranian boxing team in an official international tournament, in the Asian Amateur Boxing Championships in Bangkok 1963, and won the gold medal of the 51 kg boxing division, after defeating Masao Karasawa on points, in the final, becoming the first Iranian boxer to win a gold medal. In the Asian Games in Bangkok 1966, Aghaie won the bronze medal of the 57 kg boxing division. He won the bronze medal of the 57 kg boxing division in the Asian Amateur Boxing Championships in Colombo 1967; his last Asian medal, making him one of the most decorated Iranian boxers of all time.

References

External links 
http://www.photoaman.com/photoview-34005-710-37.html
http://www.photoaman.com/photoview-34002-710-37.html

1944 births
2009 deaths
Sportspeople from Tehran
Olympic boxers of Iran
Boxers at the 1964 Summer Olympics
Asian Games medalists in boxing
Boxers at the 1966 Asian Games
Asian Games bronze medalists for Iran
Iranian male boxers
Medalists at the 1966 Asian Games
Flyweight boxers
21st-century Iranian people
20th-century Iranian people